Janoš Hegediš (born 28 May 1955) is a Yugoslav athlete. He competed in the men's triple jump at the 1976 Summer Olympics.

References

1955 births
Living people
Athletes (track and field) at the 1976 Summer Olympics
Yugoslav male triple jumpers
Olympic athletes of Yugoslavia
Place of birth missing (living people)